Tschudi's nightjar or lesser band-winged nightjar (Systellura decussata) is a species of nightjar in the family Caprimulgidae. It is found in Chile and Peru.

Taxonomy and systematics

Tschudi's nightjar was originally considered a species, then a subspecies of band-winged nightjar (Systellura longirostris), and since 2016 again is treated as a species. It also was assigned for a time to genus Caprimulgus. Its current position in genus Systella is not completely resolved; it shares the genus with the band-winged nightjar but does not seem to be closely related to it. It is monotypic.

Description

It is overall grayish brown with blackish speckles. The male has a broad tawny or cinnamon collar on the hindneck, a small white patch on the throat, white bands on the wing, and white bands and tips on the tail. The female's throat is buff, the bands on the wing are buff, and the tail usually has no white.

Distribution and habitat

Tschudi's nightjar is found along most of western Peru and extreme northern Chile. It inhabits the littoral and foothills in this arid landscape. It generally keeps to open country, clearings, and wooded edges though it is also found in urban areas including Lima, Peru.

Behavior

Feeding

Nothing is known about Tschudi's nightjar's diet or feeding behavior.

Breeding

The breeding season of Tschudi's nightjar is thought to be from November or earlier to January. Essentially nothing else is known about its breeding phenology.

Vocalization

Tschudi's nightjar's song is "a loud series of well-defined, but slightly buzzy 'cueeo' notes". Its alarm call is "a slightly squeaky-sounding 'wick'".

Status

The IUCN has assessed Tschudi's nightjar as being of Least Concern. It has a range estimated to be at least , and though its population has not been quantified it is thought to be stable.

References

Tschudi's nightjar
Tschudi's nightjar
Birds of Peru
Birds of Chile
Tschudi's nightjar